Phoebe concinna is a species of beetle in the family Cerambycidae. It was described by White in 1856. It is known from Brazil, Colombia and Ecuador.

References

Hemilophini
Beetles described in 1856